FC Abovyan, is a defunct Armenian football club from the town of Abovyan, Kotayk Province. The club was formed in 2005 and participated in the Armenian First League during the same year. However, the club was dissolved by the end of the 2005 season of the First League.

League record

References
RSSSF Armenia (and subpages per year)

Association football clubs established in 2005
Association football clubs disestablished in 2005
Abovyan
2005 establishments in Armenia
2005 disestablishments in Armenia